The Dead Live By Love is the second and final full-length album by Scottish metalcore band Mendeed.

Track listing
"Burning Fear" - 4:15
"The Fight" - 3:30
"The Dead Live By Love" - 5:35
"Fuel the Fire" - 3:23
"Gravedigger" - 6:19
"Our War" - 3:10
"Blood Brothers" - 4:56
"Through Dead Eyes" - 3:16
"Reload 'n' Kill" - 5:15
"Take Me As I Am" - 4:36
"It's Not Over Yet" - 4:32
"Thirteen" - 4:54

Bonus tracks

European Digipack
"Masquerade" - 3:52

Enhanced CD features include:
Mendeed Media Player
The Dead Live By Love Music Video

Japanese edition
"Childplay" - 3:40
"Masquerade" - 3:52

Enhanced CD features include:
The Dead Live By Love Music Video

References

2007 albums
Mendeed albums